RFA Salvictor (A500) was a salvage vessel of the Royal Fleet Auxiliary.

Salvictor was built by Wm. Simons & Co. Ltd. of Renfrew, launched on 11 March 1944, and commissioned on 31 March 1944. Decommissioned in 1970, the ship was handed over to the breakers at Briton Ferry on 19 June 1970.

King Salvor-class salvage vessels
Ships built on the River Clyde
1944 ships